Ross L. Wilson (born August 22, 1955) is an American diplomat who was the chargé d'affaires of the United States to Afghanistan from 2020 to 2021. He was the U.S. Ambassador to Turkey from 2005 to 2008 and the U.S. Ambassador to Azerbaijan from 2000 to 2003, with the personal rank of Minister-Counselor. He also teaches part-time at Carleton College. Ambassador Wilson is also the director of the Dinu Patriciu Eurasia Center at the Atlantic Council.

Early life and education
Wilson was born in Minneapolis, Minnesota on August 22, 1955. He received a Bachelor's degree magna cum laude from the University of Minnesota in 1977 and master's degrees from Columbia University (1979) and the National War College (1995). Early in his career, he served in the State Department’s Offices of Soviet Union and Egyptian Affairs.

Career
Wilson served as U.S. Consul General at the American embassy in Moscow, USSR from 1980 to 1982, at the American embassy in Prague, Czechoslovakia from 1985 to 1987, again in Moscow from 1987 to 1990. He was Special Assistant to Under Secretary of State for Economic Affairs and Counselor of the Department Zoellick in 1990–1992. From 1992 to 1994, Wilson worked in Washington D.C. for Secretaries of State Baker, Eagleburger and Christopher in 1992–1994 as Deputy Executive Secretary of the Department of State. He later served as U.S. Consul General again in Melbourne, Australia from 1995 to 1997.

From 1997 to 2000, Wilson was Principal Deputy to the Ambassador-at-Large and Special Advisor to the Secretary of State for the New Independent States of the former Soviet Union.

President Clinton nominated him as U.S. Ambassador to the Republic of Azerbaijan in February 2000, and he served in that capacity in 2000–2003. Between June 2003 and February 2005, Wilson served as U.S. Senior Negotiator for the Free Trade Area of the Americas (FTAA) at the Office of the U.S. Trade Representative. In this capacity, he headed the U.S. delegation in the FTAA negotiations and was responsible for the development, coordination and implementation of U.S. government negotiating positions and strategies in these trade talks. Between February and August 2005, Wilson served as Executive Assistant and Chief of Staff for Deputy Secretary of State Robert B. Zoellick, providing policy and staff support to the Deputy Secretary on the entire range of issues in U.S. foreign policy.

Wilson was nominated to serve at the Ankara embassy by President George W. Bush on October 28, 2005. He was confirmed by the United States Senate on November 18 and sworn in by Secretary of State Condoleezza Rice on December 2. He arrived in Turkey on December 3 and presented his credentials to President Ahmet Necdet Sezer on December 8, 2005.

On July 9, 2008, a guard post outside the U.S. Consulate in Istanbul, Turkey was attacked by three gunmen. They killed three Turkish police officers, and wounded several others, before being killed by Turkish police. In response to the attack, Wilson stated:

Wilson is the recipient of the President’s Meritorious Service Award (2005), Azerbaijan’s Order of Honor, and numerous State Department awards.

In January 2020, Wilson was asked to serve as chargé d'affaires to Afghanistan, pending a permanent ambassador. On 15 August 2021, in the face of the Taliban advance on Kabul, Wilson and the U.S. Embassy in Kabul relocated to Hamid Karzai International Airport. On August 30, Wilson departed Kabul aboard the last evacuation flight as the final members of the U.S. military left Afghanistan. On August 31, the embassy transferred operations to Doha, Qatar, from where staff began providing limited consular services concentrated on the evacuation effort, including processing visas for people leaving Afghanistan. Deputy Chief of Mission Ian McCary took over as Chargé d'Affaires when the embassy relocated to Doha, and Wilson returned to the U.S.

Personal life
Wilson is married to Margo Squire, who is also a career diplomat with the State Department. They have two sons.

References

External links
United States Department of State: Biography of Ross Wilson

1955 births
Living people
21st-century American diplomats
Ambassadors of the United States to Azerbaijan
Ambassadors of the United States to Turkey
Ambassadors of the United States to Afghanistan
University of Minnesota alumni
School of International and Public Affairs, Columbia University alumni
People from Minneapolis
George Washington University faculty
United States Foreign Service personnel